Nuphar lutea, the yellow water-lily, brandy-bottle,  or spadderdock, is an aquatic plant of the family Nymphaeaceae, native to northern temperate and some subtropical regions of Europe, northwest Africa, western Asia, North America, and Cuba. This interesting species found on both sides of the Atlantic Ocean was used as a food source and in medicinal practices from prehistoric times with potential research and medical applications going forward.

Botanical description and etymology 

Nuphar lutea’s wide distribution and long-standing interest as an object of food, medicine, horticulture and folklore has led to many common or popular names. The following list is testimony to this species’ long history:

This species’ botanical name "Nuphar lutea (L.) Sm." includes its scientific name (Nuphar lutea), genus (Nuphar), specific epithet (lutea), a standard author abbreviation for Carl Linnaeus (L.), and an author citation for James Edward Smith (Sm.). Nuphar is derived from the Arabic and Persian , meaning “pond-lily.” Lutea is Latin for “golden, saffron, orange-yellow.” Carl Linnaeus (1701-1778) was the Swedish botanist, physician, and father of modern plant taxonomy, who first described the species. James Smith (1759-1828) was an English botanist and founder of the Linnean Society, the first person to segregate Nuphar from the genus Nymphaea, validating its current accepted botanical name. Smith “neglected shifting the feminine epithet of Nymphaea lutea to neuter Nuphar luteum, publishing the scientific name as Nuphar lutea.” A 1998 proposal to amend the gender to the neuter Nuphar luteum was approved, but subsequently the name reverted to Smith’s original designation. This explains why the species is described by both names in botanical literature.

Henry Conard’s classic Waterlilies: A Monograph of the Genus Nympaea, documented early and widespread nomenclature instability for Nuphar and for the genus it was separated from, noting disagreement over botanical names leading to much confusion. “The outcome, nevertheless, is a disconcerting abundance of synonyms and misapplications throughout the literature.” This has been true for many of the species in the genus Nuphar and for Nymphaeaceae, the lily family, as a whole. An early essay on how the Nuphar and Nymphaea genera “have been confounded” was authored by Edward Lee Greene (1843-1915), with early challenges to the currently accepted designation and authority on Nuphar lutea.

Plant form and growth 

F. G. Hayne’s Faithful Representation and Description of the Plants Used in Medicine published in 1813 offered an illustration of Nuphar latea “in its natural size”—centered on its large crown leaf, several emerging leaflets from the plant’s root system (rhizome), and its distinctive yellow flower set on a stem above the water surface. The copper plate from this early botanical treatise adds the following details: Figures 3 and 4, the male fertilizing organ (stamen) composed of filaments capped by pollen-containing anthers; Figures 5 and 6, the flower’s female reproductive part (pistil), containing a cup-like ovary topped by pollen-receptive tip (stigma), whole and cut lengthwise; Figures 7 and 8, the mature berry (ovule) protected by outer petals and sepals, whole and sliced; and Figures 9 through 12, the mature berry holding seed, natural size and enlarged, then sliced on two axes. The pollen grain photographed here is a 30.70 μm (micrometer) yellow sphere of prickly (echinate) ornamentation with well-developed spines indicating “primitive phylogenetic position of the genus [Nuphar] as well as for Nymphaeaceae [lily family].”

Nuphar lutea flowers emerge about three years after seed germination, blooming mid-spring through early autumn, each flower taking 4 to 5 days to develop—a process incorporating secretion of a sweet-smelling nectar on the stigma, pollen cross-fertilization by a host of insects (bees, beetles, flies, aphids), expansion of the female reproductive parts (gynoecium) up to three times in diameter, birthing as many as 400 seeds, and finally dispersal of the seeds on the water surface as the seed-head bursts, spreading them up to 80 m/h (meters/hour) over a 72-hour period before they sink to the bottom.

The flower is solitary, terminal, held above the water surface; it is hermaphrodite, 2–4 cm diameter, with five or six large bright yellow sepals and numerous small yellow petals largely concealed by the sepals. Flowering is from June to September, and pollination is entomophilous, by flies attracted to the alcoholic scent. The flower is followed by a green bottle-shaped fruit, containing numerous seeds which are dispersed by water currents.

New plants or colonies of Nuphar lutea can also be generated by the root system pictured in the illustration, described as follows: “Branching, spongy, tuberous rhizomes 20-150 mm in diam., firmly attached to the substrate [lake floor], dense tangled hairs around leaf scars.” New flower stalks and leaves—submerged and floating on the surface—continually emerge on the growing network of rhizomes. The common name “spadderdock” comes from spattered seed when the fruit bursts, the common name “brandy bottle” from the aroma produced by the flowers which is similar to stale alcohol.

Taxonomy 
 
Some botanists have treated Nuphar lutea as the sole species in Nuphar, including all the other species in it as subspecies and giving the species a holarctic range, but the genus is now more usually divided into eight species (see Nuphar for details).

Ecology 

Habitat for Nuphar lutea ranges widely from moving to stagnant waters of “shallow lakes, ponds, swamps, river and stream margins, canals, ditches, and tidal reaches of freshwater streams;” alkaline to acidic waters; and sea level to mountainous lakes up to 10,000 feet in altitude. The species is less tolerant of water pollution than water-lilies in the genus Nymphaea. This aquatic plant grows in shallow water and wetlands, with its roots in the sediment and its leaves floating on the water surface; it can grow in water up to 5 metres deep. It is usually found in shallower water than the white water lily, and often in beaver ponds. Since the flooded soils are deficient in oxygen, aerenchyma in the leaves and rhizome transport oxygen from the atmosphere to the rhizome roots. Often there is mass flow from the young leaves into the rhizome, and out through the older leaves. This “ventilation mechanism” has become the subject of research because of this species’ substantial benefit to the surrounding ecosystem by "exhaling" methane gas from lake sediments.

Nuphar lutea plant colonies in turn are affected by organisms that graze on its leaves, gnaw on stems, and eat its roots, including turtles, birds, deer, moose,  porcupines, and more. The rhizomes are often consumed by muskrats. The Waterlily Leaf Beetle, Galerucella nymphaeae, spends its entire life cycle around various Nuphar species, exposing leaf tissue to microbial attack and loss of floating ability.

With other species in the Nymphaeales order, Nuphar lutea provides habitat for fish and a wide range of aquatic invertebrates, insects, snails, birds, turtles, crayfish, moose, deer, muskrats, porcupine, and beaver in shallow waters along lake, pond, and stream margins across the multiple continents where it is found.

Two major threats to Nuphar lutea will continue to be global warming and eutrophication of the habitats in which its colonies have flourished. Significant research efforts have gone into establishing the consequences of crossing critical temperature, nitrogen, and phosphorus thresholds:

Geographical distribution 

The wide distribution of Nuphar lutea across North America, Eurasia, and North Africa calls for some explanation. Fossil evidence combined with recent phylogenetic studies point to the family of water lilies (Nymphaeaceae) being among the first flowering plants, with genus Nuphar a basal branch in its clade on the angiosperm tree.

Joseph Edgard De Langhe (1907-1998) was a Belgian engineer and botanist with expertise on ferns and related plants, who collected widely in Europe and donated his collection to Meise Botanic Garden, seven miles north of Brussels. His specimen of Nuphar lutea pictured here was collected in 1937 in Wijnegem, just to the east of Antwerp, Belgium, in shallow water near the Albert Canal. This specimen includes leaves, flower, pistil, stems, and rhizome. De Lange’s specimen was collected in Europe’s lowlands.

Frank Tweedy (1854-1937) was an American topographer and botanist who worked with the United States Geological Survey, collecting over 6000 specimens during his 43-year career, many of them from mountainous habitats in New York and western states. One of his earliest specimens was collected in the shallow waters on the shore of Beaver Lake, Lewis County, a higher elevation on the border of the Adirondack Mountains of northern New York. Frank’s collection is dispersed in herbaria throughout the US and Canada, his Nuphar lutea specimen held in Yale University’s Peabody Museum of Natural History in New Haven, Connecticut.

A search of the Mid-Atlantic Herbaria Consortium website yield’s 1151 specimens of Nuphar lutea, including Frank Tweedy’s 1876 specimen from Beaver Lake, although many of these specimens are labeled as “subspecies” advena, variegate, polysepala, macrophylla, pumila, rubrodisca, and sagittifolia. An additional 357 records emerge under the alternate name Nuphar luteum Sibth. & Sm., for the neuter of lutea and recognizing the co-author of the 1809 Florae Graecae Prodromus in which Smith named and validated Nuphar lutea—Johannes Sibthorp.

The Alps make up an interesting case study in the distribution of N. lutea and N. pumila, where these mountains served as a "refugium" during the interglacial cycles, the latter species losing up to 60% of its populations because of glaciation. At the same time, Nuphar species did survive and expand their populations in this higher altitude habitat.

Research history

An early witness in the fossil record 

Plant fossil specimens confirm Nuphar lutea’s genus and family as early branches on the angiosperm tree. Noting gaps in the fossil record for Nymphaeales’ plant species, paleobotanical researchers report well-preserved Nuphar seeds from the early Eocene epoch -- 56 to 33.9 million years ago (mya) -- in coal mines of Japan and rock formations in China, identified positively based on their morphology and anatomy. These finds add to older fossil seeds unearthed in North Dakota, dating back to the Paleocene epoch (66-56 mya).

The Cretaceous epoch -- a geological period which ran from 145 to 66 mya -- pushes Nuphar and its family of species to the evolutionary birth and rapid spread of flowering plants across the globe. That fact alone makes Nuphar lutea an object of intense research interest.

The six illustrations here of extinct Nymphaeales seeds -- or what are usually described as the plant berry or fruit in the literature -- found on Seymour Island, Antarctica, are well-preserved and date from the Eocene epoch. The species has been named Notonuphar antarctica, with the following illustration key: (a) seed with germination cap, (b) seed showing smooth outer surface, (c) broken seed showing cells of the protective outer layer (exotesta), (d) root tips or apical part of broken seed with germination cap preserved, (e) palisade-shaped cells of the exotesta, and (f) surface view of the seed shown in illustration (b).

As a perennial food source 

Nuphar lutea has a long history of usage as a valued food source. The field of archaeobotany documents this species’ tubers and charred seeds present in Vologda River digs in northern Russia since Early Neolithic times (ca 10,000 years BCE). The author of Edible and Medicinal Plants offered the following summary of this species’ wide usage in the Native American diet, where harvesting was done by canoe in late summer and early autumn:

A storied history from ancient times 

Henry Conard’s seminal work titled The Waterlilies, published in 1905, was the first attempt to present a synopsis of plant family Nymphaea for the English-speaking world, noting that “serious confusion exists concerning the identities of the parent species.” His survey of the pre-Linnaean literature of China, India, Greece, and Rome summarized this plant family as widely observed in Eurasia, and specifically held as an object of beauty with distinct medicinal properties noted by authorities such as Aristotle and Diodorus Siculus. The “white lotus” member of the lily family became a sacred symbol for the Hindu and Egyptian—for example, as an emblem for the Nile God.” Another source gives the following account:
 

Medieval European study of the family divided it into a white and yellow-flowered genus, with three scientific names designated by 1613: Nymphaea alba, Nymphaea candida, and Nuphar lutea.

Official description and botanical name 

Two names are now associated with Nuphar lutea’s more recent botanical record, Nuphar lutea (L.) Sm. -- Linnaeus (1753) and Smith (1809). The former adopted three names for the Nymphaea genus found in Europe and America, Nymphaea lutea for the yellow water lily, Nymphaea alba major for the white water lily, and Nymphaea nelumbo for India’s water lotus. Smith distinguished yellow from white lilies by returning to the pre-Linnaean name Nuphar for yellow lutea, retaining the classical name Nymphaea for the white water lily. He thus received credit for separating Nuphar from the Nymphaea genus, officially naming this species. By 1908, 10 varieties, 10 forms, and two subforms, or subspecies, were recognized under three Eurasian species, N. lutea, N. pumila, and N. intermedia.

The identification of North American Nuphar species similarly expanded to include 17 species and two subspecies, based on a few variable characteristics, and resulting in the taxonomic confusion that has followed Nuphar lutea and its genus and family right up to the present time.

A new proposal tested and confirmed 

In 1956, botanist Ernest Beal’s reappraised the Nuphar genus as a whole – North American together with Eurasian specimens – and offered a new option: one genus (Nuphar) comprising just two species, Nuphar lutea, Beal, and Nuphar japonica, the only taxon in Japan. Beal explained polymorphic variations observed in N. lutea specimens as nine subspecies which arose because of relatively minor geographical or ecological differences:

A doctoral research project conducted by Donald Padgett, using morphometric-pollen analysis with cladistic phylogenetic studies of 10 perennial Nuphar "species" in northern New Hampshire in 1997 tested and confirmed Beal’s conclusions that the long list of Nuphar “species” on both sides of the Atlantic are members of just two “sections” in that one genus. His evolutionary reconstruction located genus Nuphar and its species lutea at the base of the angiosperm tree, allied with Nuphar sect. Astylata on what he referred to as an “Old World/New World divergence,” dividing up the genus as follows:

Padgett went on to demonstrate that N. ×rubrodisca is a hybrid of N. variegate and N. microphylla on four criteria of hybridity—geographically, the sharing of 15 characteristics, in cross-pollination tests, and with 22 genetic markers. After reviewing four additional hybrid candidates, Padgett concluded with Beal that “hybridization may occur frequently in Nuphar,” although contrary to Beal he demonstrated major differences between “New World” N. microphylla and “Old World” N. pumilla, indicating “clear morphological divergence among the dwarf yellow water lilies.” Interestingly, the number of sepals on a Nuphar specimen has also confirmed Beal and Padgett’s “5-sepaled taxa as distinct from 6-9-sepaled taxa, with several significant differences in fruit as well as floral characters.”

Recent cladistic and phylogenetic findings 

The evolutionary origin of angiosperms or Magnoliopsida—flowering plants with seeds that develop from fertilization of an ovule or egg within an enclosed hollow ovary—has long been a biological mystery. The classic statement of this was made by Charles Darwin in 1879 in a letter to Joseph Dalton Hooker (1817-1911), Director of the Royal Botanical Gardens, Kew, London, in which he stated, “The rapid development as far as we can judge of all the higher plants within recent geological times is an abominable mystery.” Darwin’s 1879 letter was not referring to the angiosperm division (or clade) as is often assumed. He viewed this rapid and perplexing diversification taking place early in the Cretaceous period, ca 140 million years ago, in a sub-group of this division—the class formerly referred to as Magnoliopsida, now generally known as Dicotyledon plants or Dicots. This is an important starting point for human knowledge of the 79% of flowering plant species which rapidly spread across the planet in that early epoch.

One of the reasons Nuphar lutea’s genus and family have become the subject of increasing cladistic focus is that this species is located in a basal position on the evolutionary tree, or in other words, among the earliest flowering plants on earth. Understanding lily development and genetic structure will provide clues to solving Darwin’s “abominable mystery,” the dynamics behind the sudden explosion of angiosperms across the globe. The following quote refers to Nuphar’s sister genus on that tree:

Interestingly, flower and rhizome formation in genus Nuphar has come under recent electron microscope study by phylogenetic researchers, on the assumption that the very first angiosperms—which have left no trace in the fossil record – share many of the unique characteristics of the basal genus of which Nuphar lutea is a part. Russian biologists are foremost in these efforts, exploring the "golden spiral" formation of the rhizome and the whorl mechanism by which flower parts develop—this photograph capturing a Nuphar lutea Gynoecium at a late stage in flower development, “pe” for petal and “s5” for one of its five sepals.

Accurately placing Nuphar and its sister species in the Nymphaeaceae family on the “Tree of Life” will also be a necessary step in sorting out taxonomic confusion that existed long before Linnaeus and Smith first distinguished and described this species within its plant family. The list of research articles using DNA barcoding to accurately plot Nuphar lutea on its phylogenetic tree (phylogram) is a long one. The phylogram included here depicts Nuphar lutea as a basal species in its branch of “the Nympheales group.” The following quote from Towards a Complete Species Tree of Nymphaea puts the need for continuing research in proper perspective:

Conservation status 

After the receding of the glaciers from Europe ca 15,000 years ago, populations of N. pumila and N. lutea have returned to the Swiss Alps, with 37 populations of the former identified. Several current threats to these plant colonies have been identified in Alpine Botany, including hybridization between these species, runoff from excessive nutrients (eutrophication), and climate change:

The distribution or range maps included with this article certainly put Nuphar lutea in a global context, with limited regions where the species has been introduced (Bangladesh, New Zealand, and Primorye) and one where it has gone extinct (Sicilia). Conservation efforts on a global scale are needed to guarantee the benefits of this valuable species, its sisters, and genera in the lily family.

Another conservation concern for this and the other plants is “the desertification of the world,” a leading cause for species extinction.
 

There is another side to Nuphar lutea and like species, hinted at by its common name “Spatterdock” or “Splatterdock.” It can spread so fast under favorable conditions that some jurisdictions treat it like an invasive species. The Lake Lemon Conservancy District in southern Indiana has implemented an "Aquatic Plant Management Plan" with four methods for controlling its lake invasives—chemical or biological control, water level manipulation, and mechanical harvesting.

Symbolism 

Stylized red leaves of the yellow water lily, known as seeblatts or pompeblêden are used as a symbol of Frisia. The flag of the Dutch province of Friesland features seven pompeblêden.
Stone masons carved forms of the flowers on the roof bosses of Bristol Cathedral and Westminster Abbey, these are thought to encourage celibacy.

Images

See also 
The International Waterlily & Water Gardening Society, and Nuphar records

References 

Nymphaeaceae
Flora of Europe
Flora of Africa
Flora of Asia